A person's waist-to-height ratio (WHtR), occasionally written WtHR or  called waist-to-stature ratio (WSR), is defined as their waist circumference divided by their height, both measured in the same units. It is used as a predictor of obesity-related cardiovascular disease.  The WHtR is a measure of the distribution of body fat. Higher values of WHtR indicate higher risk of obesity-related cardiovascular diseases; it is correlated with abdominal obesity.

More than twenty-five years ago, waist-to-height ratio (WHtR) was first suggested as a simple health risk assessment tool because it is a proxy for 'harmful' central adiposity  and a boundary value of 0.5 was proposed to indicate increased risk. A WHtR of over 0.5 is critical and signifies an increased risk; a 2010 systematic review of published studies concluded that "WHtR may be advantageous because it avoids the need for age-, sex- and ethnic-specific boundary values". In April 2022, the UK's National Institute for Health and Care Excellence (a government body) proposed new guidelines which suggested that all adults "ensure their waist size is less than half their height in order to help stave off serious health problems". In September 2022, NICE formally adopted this guideline.

According to World Health Organization guidance, the waist circumference is usually measured midway between the lower rib and the iliac crest.

Guidelines

United Kingdom 

In April 2022, the UK's National Institute for Health and Care Excellence (a government body) proposed new guidelines which suggested that all adults "ensure their waist size is less than half their height in order to help stave off serious health problems". In September 2022, NICE formally adopted this guideline.

Suggested boundary values 
The October 2022 NICE guidelines have suggested boundary values for WHtR (defining the degree of central adiposity) as follows:
 healthy central adiposity: waist-to-height ratio 0.4 to 0.49, indicating no increased health risks
 increased central adiposity: waist-to-height ratio 0.5 to 0.59, indicating increased health risks 
 high central adiposity: waist-to-height ratio 0.6 or more, indicating further increased health risks. 
NICE say that these classifications can be used for people with a Body Mass Index (BMI) of under 35, for both sexes and all ethnicities, including adults with high muscle mass. The health risks associated with higher levels of central adiposity include type 2 diabetes, hypertension and cardiovascular disease. NICE have proposed the same boundary values for children of 5 years and over.

Boundary values were first suggested for WHtR in 1996 to reflect health implications and were portrayed on a simple chart of waist circumference against height.  The boundary value of WHtR=0.4 was suggested to indicate the start of the 'OK' range. The 0.5 boundary value was suggested to indicate the start of the 'Take Care' range, with the 0.6 boundary value indicated the start of the 'Take Action' range.

Simplified guidelines 

The first boundary value for increased risk  of WHtR 0.5 translates into the simple message "Keep your waist to less than half your height". The updated NICE guideline says  "When talking to a person about their waist-to-height ratio, explain that they should try and keep their waist to half their height (so a waist-to height ratio of under 0.5)".

Public health tool 

WHtR  is a proxy for central (visceral or abdominal) adiposity: values of WHtR are significantly correlated with direct measures of central (visceral or abdominal) adiposity using techniques such as CT, MRI or DEXA.

WHtR  is an  indicator of 'early health risk': several systematic reviews and meta-analyses of data in adults of all ages, as well as in children and adolescents, have supported the superiority of WHtR over the use of BMI and waist circumference in predicting early health risk.

Cross-sectional studies in many different global populations have supported the premise that WHtR is a simple and effective anthropometric index to identify health risks in adults of all ages and in children and adolescents.

In a comprehensive narrative review, Yoo concluded that "additional use of WHtR with BMI or WC may be helpful because WHtR considers both height and central obesity. WHtR may be preferred because of its simplicity and because it does not require sex- and age-dependent cut-offs".

As an  indicator of mortality 

Not only does WHtR have a close relationship with morbidity, it also has a clearer relationship with mortality than BMI.

As an  indicator of central adiposity 
Many cross- sectional studies have shown that, even within the normal BMI range, many adults  have WHtR which is above 0.5.  Many children show the same phenomenon. Risk factors for metabolic diseases and mortality are raised in these subjects.

See also
 Allometry – Study of the relationship of body size to shape, anatomy, physiology, and behaviour
 Body fat percentage – Total mass of fat divided by total body mass, multiplied by 100
 Body Mass Index - Total mass divided by the square of height 
 Body shape – General shape of a human body
 Body water – Water content of an animal's body
 Waist–hip ratio – Dimensionless ratio of circumference

References

Further reading 

 

Body shape
Classification of obesity
Medical signs
Obesity
Anthropometry